Maria del Tránsito Sorroza (fl. 1646) was an Afro-Ecuadorian woman who obtained her emancipation from slavery due to her skill as a midwife. She became known by the nickname "Hands of Silk".

Biography 
Tránsito Sorroza was a woman of African descent, who lived in Guayaquil during the seventeenth century. She dedicated herself to the role of midwife and such was her ability that was given the nickname "Hands of Silk". In recognition of her contribution to the society of the time, she was granted emancipation in 1646. She also brought up several young black women who were born illegitimate.

Legacy 
The doctor and philanthropist Ignacio Hurtado de López used his own money to build the Nuestra Señora de Tránsito Hospital in Guayaquil in honour of María del Tránsito Sorroza. In 2017 her life featured in the exhibition Mujeres de Guayaquil, siglo XVI al XX.

References 

Freedmen
Year of birth unknown
Year of death unknown
Afro-Ecuadorian
Midwives
Ecuadorian women
17th-century African people
Ecuadorian slaves
17th-century slaves